The Valea Fânețelor (also: Valea Fânațelor or Ghepiș) is a left tributary of the river Barcău in Romania. It discharges into the Barcău near Cenaloș. It flows through the villages Cuieșd, Țigăneștii de Criș, Picleu, Brusturi, Păulești, Gurbești, Spinuș, Ciulești and Sărsig.

References

Rivers of Romania
Rivers of Bihor County